Bohan may refer to:

People
 Elizabeth Baker Bohan (1849–1930), British-born American author and artist
 Marc Bohan (born 1926), French fashion designer

Places
 Stone of Bohan, son of Reuben, a place referred to in the Book of Joshua
 Bohan, Wallonia, a former municipality in Wallonia
 Mohan, Yunnan (simplified Chinese: 磨憨; Tai Lue: Bo Han), a border town in Mengla County, Yunnan, China

Other
 Bohán, a native people of South America who lived in modern-day Uruguay along the Uruguay River
 A fictional island, based on the Bronx, in the video game Grand Theft Auto IV